Peter Costa may refer to:

 Peter Costa (poker player) (born 1956), British poker player
 Peter Costa (actor), former American child actor
 Peter Costa (footballer) (born 1984), Indian footballer